Luiz Leandro Abreu de Lima (born 9 November 1985), known as Leandro Lima or Leandrinho, is a Brazilian professional footballer who plays for Paysandu Sport Club as a winger.

Club career
Lima was born in Fortaleza, Ceará. After making his professional debut with Associação Desportiva São Caetano, he went on to represent Brazil at both the 2007 FIFA U-20 World Cup and the 2007 South American U-20 Championship, helping the national side to the conquest of the latter tournament.

In July 2007, Lima signed a five-year contract with Portugal's FC Porto. He struggled heavily in his first season and, furthermore, was later involved in a false documentation incident after it was revealed that he had not been born on 19 December 1987, as initially registered (he was also "named" Luis Leandro Abreu de Lima in the initial procedures).

Lima spent the entire 2008–09 campaign on loan to fellow Primeira Liga club Vitória de Setúbal, helping the sadinos barely avoid relegation. On 17 July 2009 he was once again loaned, returning to Brazil with Cruzeiro Esporte Clube.

In late April 2010, after Cruzeiro were eliminated from the Copa Libertadores by fellow Brazilians São Paulo FC, Lima was released alongside eight teammates. In late August he returned to Portugal, agreeing to a two-year deal at U.D. Leiria.

Lima returned to Brazil on 7 July 2011, joining Série A team Avaí FC. After appearing in only nine matches and suffering relegation, he was released.

Lima signed with K League's Daegu FC on 19 January 2012, leaving at the end of the season but returning shortly after. In 2014, after being relegated, he moved to fellow league club Jeonnam Dragons.

References

External links

1985 births
Living people
Sportspeople from Fortaleza
Brazilian footballers
Association football wingers
Campeonato Brasileiro Série A players
Campeonato Brasileiro Série B players
Campeonato Brasileiro Série C players
Associação Desportiva São Caetano players
Cruzeiro Esporte Clube players
Avaí FC players
Santa Cruz Futebol Clube players
Fortaleza Esporte Clube players
Esporte Clube Juventude players
Paysandu Sport Club players
Primeira Liga players
FC Porto players
Vitória F.C. players
U.D. Leiria players
K League 1 players
Daegu FC players
Jeonnam Dragons players
Brazil youth international footballers
Brazil under-20 international footballers
Brazilian expatriate footballers
Expatriate footballers in Portugal
Expatriate footballers in South Korea
Brazilian expatriate sportspeople in Portugal
Brazilian expatriate sportspeople in South Korea